Dikili can refer to:

 Dikili
 Dikili, Hınıs
 Dikili, Horasan